Phil Heywood is an American fingerstyle acoustic guitar player, singer and composer.

Biography
Raised in Iowa, Heywood has been based in the Minneapolis area since the mid-1980s.

Heywood has performed as an opening act for Leo Kottke, Norman Blake, Chris Smither and Greg Brown and has performed with Chet Atkins, Tim Sparks, Pat Donohue, and Peter Lang.

He has also performed on such national venues as A Prairie Home Companion and won the National Fingerstyle Guitar Championship at the Walnut Valley Festival in Winfield, Kansas in 1986.

Discography
 1990: Some Summer Day
 1996: Local Joe
 1997: Ye Olde Wooden Guitar Christmas (compilation with Pat Donohue and Dan Neale)
 2001: Circle Tour
 2003: Banks of the River
 2008: You Got to Move
 2014: Rollin' On

References

External links
Official Phil Heywood website

Fingerstyle guitarists
Living people
1954 births
20th-century American guitarists